The Battle of Lake Okeechobee was one of the major battles of the Second Seminole War. It was fought between 800 troops of the 1st, 4th, and 6th Infantry Regiments and 132 Missouri Volunteers (under the command of Colonel Zachary Taylor), and between 380 and 480 Seminoles led by Billy Bowlegs, Abiaca, and Halpatter Tustenuggee (Alligator) on 25 December 1837. Halpatter Tustenuggee had played a major role in the Dade Battle two years earlier. The Seminole warriors were resisting forced relocation to a reservation in Oklahoma. Though both the Seminoles and Taylor's troops emerged from the battle claiming victory, Taylor was promoted to the rank of brigadier general as a result, and his nickname of "Old Rough and Ready" came mostly due to this battle.

Taylor's command
Major General Thomas Jesup was placed in command of the war in Florida in 1836. In 1837 Jesup planned a major campaign to finally remove the Seminoles from Florida. In November, four columns started sweeping down the peninsula. One column moved down the east coast from the Mosquito Inlet along the Indian River. A second column moved south along the St. Johns River. A third column crossed from Tampa to the Kissimmee River and then proceeded down the river to Lake Okeechobee. The fourth column moved up the Caloosahatchee River. Colonel Taylor was in charge of the third column. Jesup ordered him to set up a depot somewhere near the Peace River. Taylor built Fort Gardner (near Lake Tohopekaliga) on the Kissimmee River. On December 19, Taylor left Fort Gardiner with more than 1,000 men, marching down the Kissimmee towards Lake Okeechobee. As a number of Seminoles surrendered to Taylor's column, he stopped to build Fort Basinger, and left prisoners, guards and sick men there.

Events of the battle 
Taylor's army came up to a large hammock with half a mile of swamp in front of it. On the far side of the hammock was Lake Okeechobee. Here the saw grass stood five feet high.  The mud and water were three feet deep. Horses would be of no use. It was plain that the Seminole meant this to be the battleground. They had cut the grass to provide an open field of fire and had notched the trees to steady their rifles. Their scouts were perched in the treetops to follow every movement of the troops coming up.

At about half past noon, the sun shining directly overhead and the air still and quiet, Taylor moved his troops squarely into the center of the swamp. His plan was to make a direct attack rather than encircle the Indians. All his men were on foot. In the first line were the 132 Missouri volunteers. As soon as they came within range, the Indians opened with heavy fire. The volunteers broke, and their commander, Colonel Richard Gentry, fatally wounded, was unable to rally them. The Indians then mounted a counterattack on the remaining soldiers. In the deadly assault some of the soldiers were scalped by the Indians. Gentry had suggested to Taylor before the battle an encirclement strategy which Taylor rejected, charging that Gentry was afraid of a direct confrontation.  This could have motivated Gentry to keep charging the Seminole positions even though the original battle plan had the militia retreating at the first sign of enemy fire to re-form behind the regular army lines.

As a result of the additional casualties induced by the continued charge, the Missouri Militia fled back across the swamp, where they were too disorganized and disheartened to re-form as planned. The fighting in the saw grass was deadliest for five companies of the Sixth Infantry; every officer but one, and most of their noncommissioned officers were killed or wounded. When that part of the regiment retired a short distance to re-form, they found only four men of these companies unharmed. The 6th Infantry's commander, Lieutenant Colonel Alexander R. Thompson, was among the dead. Lieutenant William H.T. Walker, later a general in the Confederate Army, was wounded in the neck, shoulder, chest, left arm, and also his leg during the battle.

26 U.S. soldiers, including the majority of Taylor's officers and NCOs, were killed, with 112 wounded, against 11 Seminoles killed and 14 wounded. The battle temporarily stopped Taylor's troops from further advancing south and no Seminoles were captured, although Taylor did capture 100 ponies and 600 head of cattle. Years later Seminole chief Holata Micco (also known as Billy Bowlegs) visited Washington and on being escorted through the buildings of the Capitol and viewing many statues and paintings, he suddenly halted before a portrait of Zachary Taylor, grinned and exclaimed: "Me whip!"
There are now over four thriving Seminole Indian reservations located in south Florida, one of which is in Okeechobee County (the location of the battle).

Battlefield endangered

The National Trust for Historic Preservation named the site on a list of "America's Most Endangered Historic Places 2000".  The state of Florida spent $3.2 million for a  park.  An annual battle reenactment is held to raise money for the State park.

Archaeological investigations carried out at the park by the U.S. National Park Service in 2015 failed to locate any evidence of the 1837 battle. The exact location of the fighting remains unknown.

References

External links 
 
 Article about preservation of battle site
 Chapter One, THE SEMINOLE WAR PERIOD 1835-1860, History of Okeechobee
 Okeechobee Battle Friends
 Florida Seminole Wars Heritage Trail.

Conflicts in 1837
1837 in the United States
Lake Okeechobee 1837
Zachary Taylor
1837 in Florida Territory
December 1837 events
Lake Okeechobee